The Burha River (also called Burhaghagh River) flows through the Latehar district of Palamu division in the Indian state of Jharkhand.

A little to the south of Betla National Park is the wide bowl shaped Chhechhari valley, with a high hill range around it. The rim of the bowl forms the watershed from which dozens of rivulets arise. These join together to form the Burha river, one of the major tributaries of the North Koel.

Chhechhari valley is surrounded by lofty hills on every side.

At some places the river forms the state boundary between Jharkhand and Chhattisgarh. It carries a large volume of water during rains over a rocky river bed but
during dry months it almost dries up. From Lodh Falls to Bagechampa it flows through beautiful forests and above Kutku at Bagechampa it flows into the North Koel.

References

Rivers of Jharkhand
Rivers of India